is a station on the Tokyo Metro Tozai Line in Chiyoda, Tokyo, Japan. Its station designation is T-08. It is located directly underneath the headquarters of the Mainichi Shimbun in the Palaceside Building and is directly adjacent to the northern edge of the Imperial Palace grounds. The station is also convenient to such attractions as the National Museum of Modern Art, Tokyo (3 minute walk), and the Japan Science Foundation's Science Museum (7 minute walk).

Lines
Tokyo Metro Tozai Line

Station layout

History 
Takebashi Station opened on 16 March 1966.

The station facilities were inherited by Tokyo Metro after the privatization of the Teito Rapid Transit Authority (TRTA) in 2004.

References

External links

Tokyo Metro station information

Railway stations in Japan opened in 1966
Railway stations in Tokyo
Tokyo Metro Tozai Line